Zebulon is an album performed by bassist Michael Bisio and multi-instrumentalist Joe McPhee recorded in 1998 and first released on the CIMP label.

Track listing 
All compositions by Joe McPhee and Michael Bisio
 "Makeover Makeover" - 13:13
 "Kind of a Ballad" - 8:56
 "Duosalbosity 2" - 3:56
 "Something Different" - 14:25
 "Gracie's Amazing" - 17:18
 "Undulation" - 6:43
 "Denis & Charles" - 3:55

Personnel 
Joe McPhee - tenor saxophone, alto saxophone
Michael Bisio - bass

References 

1999 albums
Michael Bisio albums
Joe McPhee albums
CIMP albums